Scott Community College is a community college in Riverdale, Iowa, near Bettendorf, and is part of the Eastern Iowa Community Colleges that also includes Clinton Community College and Muscatine Community College.

Scott Community College (or SCC, as it is known by students and faculty) became an entity in July 1966, the same year legislation in the Iowa General Assembly created the state's 15 community college districts, one of those being the Eastern Iowa Community College District. Offices were in downtown Bettendorf. 

SCC traces its ancestry to the former Davenport Area Technical School, a technical and vocational school administered by the Davenport School District; and Palmer Junior College, that offered two-year liberal arts programs. 

SCC's first term was Fall 1966, with tuition $150 per semester, or $10 per class for part-time students. More courses of study were added to the old Davenport Area Trade School's list of offerings, including auto body and repair, secretarial and clerical, and drafting. 

The main campus on Belmont Road in Riverdale opened in 1969. (The college has a Bettendorf mailing address but is, technically, located in the small town of Riverdale.) The campus was erected on land once owned by Alcoa. At first, the campus housed technology programs, but soon expanded to offer liberal arts/college transfer programs. The SCC campus was expanded in 1987 and again in the mid-1990s. 

The college now includes a number of locations in addition to its main campus. The Blong Technology Center is located near Interstate 80 in Davenport. The colleges West Davenport Center was opened in 2012 delivering adult and continuing education classes. The estate of V.O. and Elizabeth Figge donated the Kahl Building in Davenport to the college in 1994. After renovations, it became the school's urban campus. In January 2018 the urban campus moved into the former First Federal Savings and Loan Association and First Midwest Bank buildings. In addition, the college offers a wide variety of online courses in cooperation with the Iowa Community College Online Consortium. 

On February 5, 2007 the Eastern Iowa Community Colleges unveiled plans to turn the grounds of the former Wacky Waters Adventure Park, located near Interstate 80 in Davenport, into the Midwest Center for Public Safety Training to "serve as a unique training ground for firefighters".

In 1967, SCC's enrollment was just over 300 students. By 1989, the number ballooned to nearly 3,300. SCC's Fall 2014 enrollment was 4,634. 

The college offers intercollegiate sports in men's and women's soccer and cross country. The teams are known as the Eagles.

Programs
Scott offer both Pre-University and technical courses, in which the pre-university courses takes up four semesters which is two years total, enough for an Associate Degree, leading for the students to attend a university, usually one in the state of Iowa or Western Illinois University at their campus setting in Moline. The technical courses not just carried Associate as well but also a Certificate, 30 credits per year. The universities that the Liberal Arts and Sciences programs get transferred to are:
 Clarke University
 Mount Mercy University
 Upper Iowa University
 Western Illinois University
 University of Dubuque
 St. Ambrose University
 Iowa Wesleyan University
 University of Iowa
 Iowa State University
 University of Northern Iowa

Pre-University programs
 Arts, Communications, and English
Communications
English
Art
Theatre
Journalism
Speech
 Business
Business Administration
 Education 
Elementary Education 
Physical Education 
Secondary Education 
 Government and Public Administration, Law, and Human Resources 
History
Political Science
Psychology 
Sociology 
Social Work
Criminal Justice
Pre-Law
 Health Science
Pre-Chiropractic
Pre-Dental Hygiene
Pre-Health Professional
 Science and Mathematics 
Biology
Chemistry 
Environmental Science
Mathematics 
Physical Science
Physics

Career and technical programs
 Arts, Communications, and English
American Sign Language – English Interpreting
 Business
Accounting Management
Business Management
Supply Chain and Logistics
 Computers/Information Technology
Augmented and Virtual Reality
Cybersecurity 
Programming
Web Development
 Construction and Architecture
Heating, Ventilation, and Air Conditioning (HVAC)
 Culinary Arts and Hospitality
Culinary Arts Apprenticeship 
Culinary Arts 
Hospitality Management
 Education
Early Childhood Education
 Health Sciences
Cancer Information Management
Certified Nurse Aide (CNA)
Dental assisting
Emergency Medical Services 
Practical Nursing
Radiologic Technology
Respiratory Care
Surgical Technology
 Manufacturing 
CNC Machining
Engineering Technology
Automation
Electromechanical
Process Control
Mechanical Design Technology
Heating, Ventilation, and Air Conditioning (HVAC)
Welding
Welding
Basic Welding
General Maintenance Welding
Production Welding
Structural Welding 
 Transportation
Automotive Technology 
Diesel Technology

Scott Community College Administrators

President

Chancellor

References

External links

Scott Community College
Eastern Iowa Community College District
Blong Technology Center
Midwest Center for Safety and Rescue Training

Community colleges in Iowa
Bettendorf, Iowa
Buildings and structures in Scott County, Iowa
Educational institutions established in 1966
Education in the Quad Cities
Education in Scott County, Iowa
Quad Cities
Sports teams in the Quad Cities
1966 establishments in Iowa